Abd El Aziz Seif-Eldeen (born June 3, 1949) is a Lieutenant General of the Egyptian Armed Forces.

Biography
He joined military college in 1968, and graduated two years later. Seif-Eldeen advanced to the position of commander of the Egyptian Air Defence Forces in 2005. He is a member of the Supreme Council of the Armed Forces that became the ruling body of Egypt when Mubarak resigned on February 11, 2011.

References

1949 births
Living people
Egyptian generals
Members of the Supreme Council of the Armed Forces